This is a list of holidays in Andorra.

Besides, seven parishes in Andorra holds their annual festivals or carnivals. These dates are public holidays in such parishes.

External links
Public Holidays in Andorra in 2018

 
Andorra
Holidays